Mickey's House and Meet Mickey is a walk through and Meet & Greet attraction at Mickey's Toontown in Disneyland and Toontown at Tokyo Disneyland. Similar attractions formerly existed in the Magic Kingdom and Hong Kong Disneyland.

History
This attraction first opened at the Magic Kingdom in 1988 and was named Mickey's Country House. Another version of the attraction opened in 1993 with Mickey's Toontown at Disneyland. Another version of the attraction also opened on April 15, 1996 with Toontown at Tokyo Disneyland.

Magic Kingdom
At the Magic Kingdom, Mickey's Toontown Fair initially opened as Mickey's Birthdayland on June 18, 1988. It became Mickey's Starland on May 26, 1990, and Mickey's Toontown Fair on October 1, 1996. Its storyline portrayed the land as the holiday home for the characters who reside at Mickey's Toontown in California. This attraction existed in the land since its opening as Mickey's Birthdayland in 1988. The house changed several times since its opening.

Magic Kingdom's Mickey's Toontown Fair closed permanently in February 2011 in order to make way for the expansion of Fantasyland. Mickey's Country House also closed permanently at this time.

Disneyland
After the success of Mickey's Starland, Disneyland opened Mickey's Toontown behind It's a Small World. The land features Mickey's House along with Minnie's House, Goofy's House and Donald's Boat, and also includes Roger Rabbit's Car Toon Spin.

Mickey's Movie Barn
After touring his house, guests pass through a fake garden to enter mickey’s movie barn. The barn is filled with props and costumes from many Mickey Mouse shorts. Guest can either exit back to toontown or wait to meet Mickey.Guests wanting to meet Mickey wait in the screening room before being called by a cast member. This area used to show fake trailers for different shorts under the illusion they were being filmed there while Donald and Goofy work the projector. As of 2019, guests instead watch the newer Mickey Mouse shorts.

See also
 2011 in amusement parks

References

External links 
 Disneyland Park Attraction
 Tokyo Disneyland Attraction

Amusement park attractions introduced in 1988
Amusement park attractions introduced in 1993
Amusement park attractions introduced in 1996
Amusement park attractions introduced in 2008
Amusement park attractions that closed in 2009
Amusement park attractions that closed in 2011
Walt Disney Parks and Resorts attractions
Disneyland
Tokyo Disneyland
Hong Kong Disneyland
Mickey Mouse
Main Street, U.S.A.
Mickey's Toontown
Audio-Animatronic attractions